Bump 'n' Jump is an overhead-view vehicular combat game developed by Data East and originally released in Japan as . The arcade version was available as both a dedicated board and as part of Data East's DECO Cassette System. It was distributed in North America by Bally Midway. The goal is to drive to the end of a course while knocking enemy vehicles into the sides of the track and jumping over large obstacles such as bodies of water.

The arcade game was a commercial success in Japan and North America. The game was ported to the Atari 2600, Intellivision, ColecoVision, Nintendo Entertainment System, and Sharp X1.

Gameplay

The enemy vehicles are cars and trucks. Cars can be bumped into obstacles or jumped upon and destroyed, while trucks cannot be bumped; they can only be jumped upon to destroy them, and will sometimes drop obstacles that will destroy the player or one extra life. At the end of each level players receive bonus points for the number of enemy vehicles crashed. Going from one level to another is characterized by a change of seasons. Players get points for bumping other cars and causing the other cars to crash. If the player completes a level without destroying another car by bumping it or jumping on it, the player receives a 50,000-point bonus.

When a large obstacle which needs to jumped over, such as a body of water, is approaching, then the game displays a flashing exclamation point as a warning.

Ports

Mattel Electronics licensed Bump 'n' Jump from Data East and in 1983 released an Intellivision version and then a version for the Atari 2600. They also produced a version for ColecoVision distributed by Coleco in 1984.

Data East released a port of Burnin' Rubber as Buggy Popper for the Famicom in Japan in 1986. It was released for the Nintendo Entertainment System in North America by Vic Tokai in March 1987 as Bump 'n' Jump. Adding a level of complexity, the NES version of the game also requires that players pick up cans of gasoline that are interspersed throughout each course, as their car uses up fuel steadily throughout the game if the car goes too fast.

Reception
In Japan, Burnin' Rubber was the ninth highest-grossing arcade game of 1982. In the United States, Bump 'n' Jump was among the thirteen highest-grossing arcade games of 1983.

Legacy
In 1996, Next Generation listed it as number 65 on their "Top 100 Games of All Time", lauding the innovative jumping and bumping mechanics, the variety of cars, and the strong sensation of speed and tension.

The arcade version was made available on the PlayStation Portable in North America by G1M2 with its original title. The game also appears on the Data East Arcade Classics compilation with its original name.

Two clones were released for the Commodore 64. Burnin' Rubber in 1983 uses the chorale parts of Johann Sebastian Bach's Herz und Mund und Tat und Leben cantata for the soundtrack. Bumping Buggies was produced in 1984.

High scores
On 25 December 2011, Charlie Wehner of Missouri beat the arcade version's world record with a score of 3,175,880. On 14 September 2013, John McNeill of Brisbane, Australia claimed the world record with a score of 5,869,264 but due to ownership issues with Twin Galaxies at the time, the score was not officially recognised until 5 January 2015.

The world record using MAME was achieved by John McNeill of Brisbane, Australia on 2 March 2012 with a score of 2,531,168.

See also
 Spy Hunter

References

External links
 
 

1982 video games
Arcade video games
Atari 2600 games
ColecoVision games
Data East arcade games
Hamster Corporation games
Intellivision games
Midway video games
Nintendo Entertainment System games
Nintendo Switch games
PlayStation 4 games
Top-down racing video games
Vehicular combat games
Vic Tokai games
Vertically-oriented video games
Video games developed in Japan